Sir Richard Winn Livingstone (23 January 1880 – 26 December 1960) was a British classical scholar, educationist, and academic administrator. He promoted the classical liberal arts.

Life
Livingstone was born on 23 January 1880 in Liverpool. His father was an Anglican vicar; his mother the daughter of an Irish baron. He was educated at Winchester College and New College, Oxford. He remained at the University of Oxford until 1924 as fellow, tutor, and librarian at Corpus Christi College. In 1920, he served on the Prime Minister's committee on the classics. During 1920–22, he was co-editor of the Classical Review.

From 1924 to 1933, Livingstone served as Vice-Chancellor of Queen's University Belfast in Northern Ireland. He was knighted in 1931.

In 1933, Livingstone returned to Oxford, where he became President of Corpus Christi College. In 1944, he delivered the Rede Lecture at Cambridge on Plato and modern education. He served as vice-chancellor of the University of Oxford from 1944 until 1947. He was elected to the American Philosophical Society in 1948.

He retired in 1950 and spent his final years writing and lecturing. He died on 26 December 1960 in Oxford.

Books
 The Greek Genius And Its Meaning To Us (1912)
 A Defence of Classical Education (1916)
 The Legacy of Greece: Essays Edited by R. W. Livingstone (1921), includes an essay, titled LITERATURE, written by Livingstone
 The Pageant of Greece (1923)
 The Mission of Greece (1928)
 Greek Ideals and Modern Life (1935)
 Portrait of Socrates, being the Apology, Crito, and Phaedo of Plato (English translation), Plato, Benjamin Jowett, Richard Livingstone (1938)
 The Future in Education (1941)
 Education for a World Adrift (1943)
 Plato and Modern Education (1944)
 Education and the Spirit of the Age (1952)
 The Rainbow Bridge (1959)
-
 The History of the Peloponnesian War, Edited in Translation by Sir Richard Winn Livingstone. Oxford, London (1943)
 Essentials of education, January 1952 Issue, The Atlantic

References

External links 
 Livingstone, Sir Richard Winn (1880–1960) Knight Educationist, GB/NNAF/P130348 , The National Archives, United Kingdom
 
 

1880 births
1960 deaths
Academics of Queen's University Belfast
Alumni of New College, Oxford
English classical scholars
English educational theorists
Fellows of Corpus Christi College, Oxford
Presidents of Corpus Christi College, Oxford
Knights Bachelor
People educated at Winchester College
People from Oxford
Vice-Chancellors of Queen's University Belfast
Vice-Chancellors of the University of Oxford
Academics from Liverpool
Presidents of the Classical Association

Members of the American Philosophical Society